Corpus Christi Catholic High School (CCCHS) is an independent Roman Catholic co-educational secondary day school, located in , in the Illawarra region of New South Wales, Australia. Founded in 2006, the school is operated by the Wollongong Catholic Education Office in its service of the Roman Catholic Diocese of Wollongong. The school is registered by the NSW Board of Studies as an accredited Year 7 to Year 12 high school.

The school was designed Glanville Architects and built by One Build, Wide Form, and funded by the Australian Commonwealth and NSW governments and Catholic Authorities.

Learning Circle Program
Since the School's inception in 2006 the Students at Corpus Christi have been a part of a Learning Circle Program to enhance their experience at the School. Learning Circles are split up into stages. Stage 4 Learning Circles consist of Year 7 and 8 Students. Stage 5 Learning Circles consist of Year students and Stage 6 Learning Circles consist only of Year 11 or Year 12 students, Students in this phase of learning are paired with Learning Advisors that can help them most in their course areas. From 2006-2009 Learning Circles were picked at random and students were put into Learning Circles in no real order. More often than not, in Year 7 in particular students would not be with their Primary School Counterparts. In 2010 the organisation of the Learning Circles was altered when each colour house was designated a House Leader and Students would be put into their Learning Circle according to their House Colour. Prior to this the House Colours were used only for sporting events but now they play role in school life. From 2012 and beyond each House has expanded in Learning Circles due to the number of students who will be in the school. Corpus Christi

Technology

CCCHS originally started with a 1 to 1 laptop program but in 2017 this was phased out and replaced with a Bring Your Own Designated Device (BYODD) where students must purchase Apple Macintosh laptops before enrolment. All students and staff utilise their computers in a wireless environment and seamlessly integrate learning technology in a meaningful way. The school has developed a full co-curricular program focused on developing learning and skills of participants.

Corpus Christi Catholic High School has a fully functional video club service called 'CCN'. Standing for 'Corpus Christi Network', the group features daily LIVE news programmes for the community with a large range of professional grade equipment and connections with industry. The club has broadcast from around the world to the community and larger Catholic Education Office.

Recognition

In 2007, CCCHS was named an Apple School of Excellence by Apple Australia. Staff and students presented their innovative approach to integration at the 2007 ACEL conference held in Sydney in a session entitled "Digging Deeper: Designing a CLE". In 2008 CCCHS principal & staff received an Innovative Education award from the Australian College of Educations.

CCCHS has participated in the regional science fair and was highly commended in the 2007 Australian ANZAC Day awards.

Elizabeth Carnegie worked at Corpus Christi Catholic High School.  Her work is primarily to foster innovative pedagogy and the integration of Religion and Gospel Values into curriculum. She contributed to the Oxford Studies of Religion textbook and the Heinemann Study Guide.

See also

 List of Catholic schools in New South Wales
 Catholic education in Australia
 List of schools in Illawarra and the South East (New South Wales)
 Education in Australia

References

External links
 CCCHS School Website
 https://www.youtube.com/watch?v=kurJbj5W0ro

Educational institutions established in 2006
Catholic secondary schools in New South Wales
Schools in Wollongong
2006 establishments in Australia
Roman Catholic Diocese of Wollongong